Saint Louis Creek is a tributary of the Fraser River in Grand County, Colorado.

Course
The creek rises near Saint Louis Peak in the Arapaho National Forest. From there, it flows generally north northeastward, passing through the Fraser Experimental Forest and then Fraser itself until it reaches its confluence with the Fraser River on the east side of Highway 40 just south of Grand County Road 8 in Fraser.

History
Former United States President Dwight D. Eisenhower used to vacation with friends at the Byers Peak Ranch southwest of Fraser. Saint Louis Creek flows through the ranch, and Eisenhower used to fish for brook trout in the creek during his visits. While recuperating from his heart attack in fall 1955, Eisenhower completed a painting of the creek, frozen over in winter.

See also
List of rivers of Colorado

References

External links
1955 Painting of the creek by Dwight David Eisenhower

Rivers of Grand County, Colorado
Arapaho National Forest